Leroy Moore was an American football coach.  He served was the head football at Arkansas Agricultural, Mechanical & Normal College—now known as the University of Arkansas at Pine Bluff—from 1953 to 1955, compiling a record of 7–20–4.

Head coaching record

References

Possibly living people
Year of birth missing
Arkansas–Pine Bluff Golden Lions football coaches